Malcolm in the Middle is an American situation comedy, originally broadcast between 2000 and 2006. It has won and been nominated for a variety of different awards, including 33 Emmy Award nominations across the seven seasons of the show. The show was nominated for the Primetime Emmy Award for Outstanding Comedy Series for its second season, but lost out to Sex and the City.

Jane Kaczmarek, who portrays the eponymous character's mother Lois, was nominated for the award of Outstanding Actress in a Comedy Series seven times (once for each season), without ever winning the award.

By award

AFI Awards

American Cinema Editors

American Comedy Awards

Directors Guild of America Awards

Emmy Awards

Golden Globe Awards

Grammy Awards

NAACP Image Awards

Producers Guild of America

Satellite Awards

Screen Actors Guild Awards

TCA Awards

Viewers for Quality Television Awards

Writers Guild of America

Young Artist Awards

Peabody Award

References

External links
 List of awards at IMDb.com

Lists of awards by television series
Awards